Eteobalea serratella is a moth in the  family Cosmopterigidae. It is found in most of Europe, except the Benelux, Great Britain, Ireland, Iceland, Fennoscandia and the Baltic states. It was approved for release in the United States in 1995 for the biological control of toadflax. A few field releases have been made in western Canada and the western United States, but no established populations have been confirmed.

The wingspan is 16–18 mm. Adults are dark brown with white and copper spots. There is one generation per year.

The larvae feed on Linaria vulgaris. They are off-white with brown heads. They develop through five instars and reach a length of up to 12 mm. First instar larvae bore into the root crown where they feed on tissue inside tunnels they carve and line with silk. Mature larvae overwinter in roots and then pupate in spring inside cocoons within the root crown.

References

Moths described in 1833
Eteobalea
Moths of Europe
Moths of Asia